Alive & Kicking is a live album by the Scottish hard rock band Nazareth, released in 2003. It is an edited-down version of the concert previously released as Homecoming(2002).

Track listing

Personnel
 Pete Agnew – bass guitar
 Dan McCafferty – vocals
 Jimmy Murrison – guitar
 Lee Agnew – drums
 Ronnie Leahy – keyboards

References

Nazareth (band) live albums
2003 live albums